Silvino Lobos, officially the Municipality of Silvino Lobos, is a 4th class municipality in the province of Northern Samar, Philippines. According to the 2020 census, it has a population of 15,100 people.

History
It is a former barrio of the town of Pambujan. Its former name is Barrio Suba until it became a town in June 17, 1967.

Geography

Barangays
Silvino Lubos is politically subdivided into 26 barangays.

Balud
Cababayogan
Cabunga-an
Cagda-o
Caghilot
Camanggaran
Camaya-an
Deit De Suba
Deit De Turag
Gebonawan
Gebolwangan
Gecbo-an
Giguimitan
Genagasan
Geparayan De Turag
Gusaran
Imelda
Montalban
Suba (Poblacion)
San Isidro
Senonogan de Tubang
Tobgon
Victory
Poblacion I
Poblacion II
San Antonio

Climate

Demographics

Economy 

Silvino Lobos had the highest poverty incidence of all cities and municipalities of the Philippines in 2015.

Silvino Lobos economy is agriculture and timber-based since it is surrounded with forests.

Recently, tourism-based activities is starting to develop as its cool weather condition puts the town's temperature condition comparable to Baguio and the rugged terrain comparable to Sagada. Camping tour organizers have been bringing tourists to the site as a new road paved the way for motor vehicles to reach Silvino Lobos overland on a much shorter travel time compared to motorized boats that ply the Pambujan River to reach the town in a much longer travel time. Prior to discovery of river cruise, the town was reachable only by hiking through mountain trails from the nearest transport access point.

References

External links
 [ Philippine Standard Geographic Code]
 Philippine Census Information
 Local Governance Performance Management System

Municipalities of Northern Samar